Dafang, called Dading until 1958, is a county of Guizhou province, China. It is under the administration of Bijie city.

Climate

References

 
County-level divisions of Guizhou
Bijie